"Take Off" is a single by British pop rapper Chipmunk, released as the third single from his second studio album Transition. It is the last single to feature the stage name under Chipmunk. The song features American R&B singer Trey Songz, it was released on 15 July 2011 as a Digital download in the United Kingdom. The song's accompanying music video was released on 17 June 2011. It features appearances by both Chipmunk and Trey Songz.

Critical reception
Lewis Corner of Digital Spy reviewed the song stating: "We hate to say it, but it's going to take a helluva lot more power than this to lift Chip off the ground." .

Track listing

Chart performance

Release history

References

2011 singles
Chipmunk (rapper) songs
Songs written by Harmony Samuels
2011 songs
Jive Records singles
Song recordings produced by Harmony Samuels
Songs written by Chip (rapper)